Vice Admiral Edward Hopson (1671 – 8 May 1728) was a Royal Navy officer who served as Commander-in-Chief of the Jamaica Station.

Origins and early career
Hopson was born in 1671, the son of Anthony Hopson (1640–1679), who was a gunner at Sandham Fort on the Isle of Wight and the older brother of vice admiral Sir Thomas Hopsonn.

On 24 July 1696 he was given his first independent command, as post captain of the fifth-rate . He spent the next two years in that vessel cruising the Irish Sea. In 1702 he transferred to the command of the third-rate , in which he took part in the Battle of Vigo Bay that October. The following year, Mary served as the flagship of rear admiral Basil Beaumont during his blockade of Dunkirk the following year. Fortunately for him, Hopson was on shore when the Great Storm of 1703 struck on 27 November. The Mary was thrown onto the Goodwin Sands and sunk with all hands.

Captain Hopson appears to have spent most of the rest of the War of the Spanish Succession stationed in the Mediterranean, in command of a newly built replacement .

Admiral

In this post, he followed Norris on three more expeditions to the Baltic, in 1719, 1720 and 1721.

He was further promoted to be rear admiral of the red on 16 February 1722, but does not appear to have been actively employed until 1726, when he took a small squadron to Gibraltar, where he joined up with another squadron under Sir John Jennings to deter possible Spanish aggression. When Jennings sailed home, Hopson took over command in the Mediterranean, and was promoted to become vice admiral of the blue on 19 April 1727. With relations with Spain descending into a war, Gibraltar was reinforced by six ships under Sir Charles Wager, who took command of the post. Hopson served under him in the ensuing siege of Gibraltar.

In December 1727, Hopson was ordered to take command in the West Indies, which had been left without an admiral following the death of Sir Francis Hosier that August. During his passage across the Atlantic he was promoted to vice admiral of the white. However, like many others in the fleet, he succumbed to tropical diseases and died on 8 May 1728.

His will, dated 13 April 1720 and proved 27 July 1728, mentions his wife Jane and one son, Edward, who was still a minor. It also mentions his mother, who was still living; and a widowed sister, Jane.

References

Royal Navy vice admirals
1671 births
1728 deaths
British naval commanders in the War of the Spanish Succession
18th-century Royal Navy personnel
British military personnel of the Anglo-Spanish War (1727–1729)